The Pitcairn XO-61 was an American autogyro designed by Pitcairn Aircraft. One of the last autogyros produced, in competition with the Kellett YO-60 and the Sikorsky R-4, it fell victim to cooling problems with its rear-mounted engine and the coming of the helicopter with its ability to hover.

Also known by the company model number PA-44 and the contract designation MX-157, the contract for the XO-61 was taken over by G&A Aircraft upon G&A's acquisition of Pitcairn Aircraft.

See also

References

Citations

Bibliography
Cully, George & Andreas Parsch: MX-1 to MX-499 
Gregg, E. Stuart, "Above & Beyond: Jump Ship". Air & Space Smithsonian, March 2001 Listing, designation-systems.net
Harris, Franklin D. An Overview of Autogyros and The McDonnell XV-1 Convertiplane, NASA/CR—2003–212799. NASA Ames Research Center, October 2003
Wings of Freedom Winter 2007/2008, Volume 22 Number 4, Delaware Valley Historical Aircraft Association.

O-061
1940s United States military reconnaissance aircraft
Single-engined pusher autogyros
Twin-boom aircraft